The Battle of Araure was a battle fought during the short-lived Second Republic of Venezuela on December 5, 1813, in the city of Araure in Portuguesa State, Venezuela. Simon Bolivar's force defeated General Domingo de Monteverde to whom he had been forced to surrender the year before in July at the Siege of Puerto Cabello.

The battle

The actual battle began early in the morning of December 5 and lasted for around six hours. It was clear that the royalist troops were numerically superior to the Venezuelan patriots. The royalists had a total of 3,500 to 5,000 (depending upon the source) soldiers under the command of José Ceballos while the patriots had an unknown number of troops under Bolívar's command. Despite the superiority of the royalists, the patriots would go on to win the battle, and Bolivar would later tell his troops:
Your valor has earned yesterday a name for your corps, and through the midst of the fighting, when I saw you succeed, I named you the Victorious Battalion of Araure. You removed the enemy's flags in the moment of your victory; you have earned the famous, invincible call of Numantia.

References
Bolivar's words after the Battle (in Spanish) :es:Batalla de Araure 
Commanders and Event Date 
Size of the Spanish Force (1) 
Size of the Venezuelan and Spanish Force (2) 

Araure
Araure 1813
1813 in Venezuela
December 1813 events